Prospect Hospital was a 175-bed seven-story private hospital located in The Bronx that opened at 730 Kelly Street in 1963, closed in 1985, and is now a homeless shelter.

History
Prospect, which owned "15 brownstone buildings that are used for drug and alcohol rehabilitation and other social programs," was owned by a locally-born man,  Dr. Jacob B. Freedman, who built it in 1963. The hospital was the linchpin of the now-landmarked South Bronx neighborhood, Longwood.

An attempt had been made by a group of doctors to reopen, but it was not successful. The 175-bed seven-story facility was purchased to become "family inns" rather than being termed "homeless shelters" or "welfare hotels." The latter were described as "rooms that are often cramped and squalid." The building, located at 730 Kelly Street, was renamed Prospect Family Inn; one part of it is Prospect Family Nursery, a two-room "around the clock" setup "where parents in crisis can leave their children for up to 72 hours."

At another location, there was a predecessor medical facility "that traced its beginnings to 1919."

References

Defunct hospitals in the Bronx
History of the Bronx
Hospitals established in 1963